Laurent Eynac (4 October 1886 – 16 December 1970) was a French politician who was appointed Minister of Transportation on 7 June 1935 until 24 January 1936. He was born in Le Monastier-sur-Gazeille, Haute-Loire.

In 1940 Eynac was appointed Minister of the Air in the government of Paul Reynaud. In this role he served as part of the War Committee put together at early in the Second World War and consisting of Reynaud, President Albert François Lebrun, Naval Minister César Campinchi, War Minister Édouard Daladier, Interior Minister Georges Mandel, Eynac as Air Minister, French Navy chief Admiral François Darlan, Chief of the Air Staff General Joseph Vuillemin and French Army generals Maurice Gamelin and Alphonse Joseph Georges.

References

1886 births
1970 deaths
People from Haute-Loire
Politicians from Auvergne-Rhône-Alpes
Democratic Republican Alliance politicians
Independent Radical politicians
Transport ministers of France
French Ministers of Commerce and Industry
French Ministers of Posts, Telegraphs, and Telephones
Members of the 11th Chamber of Deputies of the French Third Republic
Members of the 12th Chamber of Deputies of the French Third Republic
Members of the 13th Chamber of Deputies of the French Third Republic
Members of the 14th Chamber of Deputies of the French Third Republic
Members of the 15th Chamber of Deputies of the French Third Republic
French Senators of the Third Republic
Senators of Haute-Loire